CCGS Bartlett is a  in operation by the Canadian Coast Guard. The vessel entered service in 1969 and was modernized in 1988. In 1982, the ship commanded the recovery efforts following the Ocean Ranger sinking off the coast of Newfoundland. The vessel is assigned to the Pacific Region and is based at Victoria, British Columbia.

Design and description
Bartlett is a member of the Provo Wallis-class buoy tenders, and is tasked with monitoring navigational aids along the West Coast of Canada.

The buoy tender is propelled by two controllable pitch propellers powered by two Mirrlees National KLSDM6 geared diesel engines creating . The vessel is ice-strengthened and carries a complement of 24, with 9 officers and 15 crew. The vessel has 11 spare berths.

Service history
The buoy tender was constructed by Marine Industries at their yard in Sorel, Quebec with the yard number 388. The vessel was completed in December 1969 and entered service with the Canadian Coast Guard. Bartlett is named after Captain Robert Bartlett who made over 40 expeditions to the Arctic. The vessel was initially assigned to serve in the Newfoundland and Great Lakes regions before transferring to the West Coast. The vessel is currently based at Victoria, British Columbia.

Bartlett was among the vessels sent to the site and directed the surface search for the crew. Only debris, liferafts and the bodies of 22 of the 84 crew of Ocean Ranger were recovered. Bartlett was modernized in 1988 at Halifax Shipyards, Halifax, Nova Scotia which saw new propulsion and navigation equipment installed.

The ship underwent a $16.9 million vessel-life extension at the Allied Shipbuilders yard in North Vancouver in 2010. The refit extended the buoy tender's life by ten years, revamping the vessel's electric systems. In October 2016, after the tugboat Nathan E. Stewart sank near Bella Bella, British Columbia and began to leak oil,  and Bartlett were deployed to help contain the spill.

References

Notes

Citations

Sources
 
 
 

Provo Wallis-class navaids tenders
Ships built in Quebec
1969 ships
Navigational aids
Navaids tenders of the Canadian Coast Guard